Béguey is a commune on the right bank of the Garonne river in the Gironde department in southwestern France.

Geography

Bordering municipalities 

On the right bank of the Garonne, the neighboring towns are Laroque to the north-east, Cadillac to the south-east, and Rions to the north-west; on the right bank, the neighboring municipalities are Cérons to the south-west and Podensac to the west.

Population

Personalities
One of Béguey's famous sons is Jean-Louis Vignes, pioneer of the California wine industry.

See also
Communes of the Gironde department

References

Communes of Gironde